

The Dutchmans Stern is a mountain in South Australia located in the Flinders Ranges about  north-west of the town of Quorn and  north east of the city of Port Augusta.

The mountain was named due to its "supposed resemblance to the stern of a Dutch vessel" with one source attributing the naming to early settlers in the vicinity while another source gives attribution to the British navigator, Matthew Flinders. Since 1987, it has been located within the boundaries of the protected area known as The Dutchmans Stern Conservation Park where its "prominent bluff" is considered to be "the main feature" of the conservation park.

See also
List of mountains in Australia

Citations and references

Citations

References
 

Mountains of South Australia
Far North (South Australia)
Flinders Ranges